Portland Group may refer to:

The Portland Group, a computer company
Portland Group (geology) or Portlandian, a series of rock strata from the Late Jurassic of southern England